Krossblade Aerospace Systems is an aviation company founded in 2014 in Phoenix, Arizona, USA. The company is known for developing a 5-seat hybrid, vertical take-off and landing, VTOL concept, SkyCruiser, and for its drone/UAV prototype, SkyProwler. Both aircraft employ the switchblade transformation mechanism to transform from a multirotor aircraft for vertical take-off and landing, to a pure winged aircraft, for rapid and efficient cruise.

Products

Krossblade SkyCruiser 
SkyCruiser is a concept of a vertical take-off and landing transformer aircraft with limited road drive capability. It has 5 seats and is powered by a hybrid power train. While all rotors and propellers are driven by electric motors, the electric energy is produced by a 400 hp internal combustion engine mated to a generator. A small battery provides backup storage of electric energy enabling SkyCruiser to briefly fly purely on stored electric power. SkyCruiser is able to fly at speeds in excess of 300 mph with a range of around 1,000 miles. Although capable of driving on roads, SkyCruiser is optimized for flight. Fast cruise bridges larger distances rapidly, while the VTOL capability enables it to land at or very close to its passengers’ destination. SkyCruiser is scheduled to come to market at the end of the current decade.

Krossblade SkyProwler 

SkyProwler is a UAV/drone prototype used by Krossblade to develop the essential mechanisms and concepts for the larger SkyCruiser. It is a purely electrical aircraft that utilizes the switchblade mechanism to transform from a multirotor mode for VTOL to a pure aircraft mode for a fast and efficient cruise. Possible applications include delivery.  SkyProwler flies with speeds of up to 55 mph.

Krossblade SkyProwler 2 
SkyProwler 2 was introduced in 2019. It has the vertical take-off and landing (VTOL) ability. VTOL is facilitated by the transforming process of its arms by folding and expanding.

Switchblade mechanism
Rather than employing a rigid frame to mount motors and rotors as is done in quadcopters and other multirotors, in the switchblade mechanism motors and rotors are mounted on movable arms. These arms can pivot and so enable storage of the rotors and motors inside the fuselage, where they do not cause aerodynamic drag and hence enable to aircraft to fly faster and more efficient. Compared to a pure winged aircraft, the VTOL system, including the switchblade mechanism, increases the weight of an aircraft by around 15%.

See also

 Flying car (fiction)
 Personal air vehicle
 Comparison of personal air vehicles
 CarterCopter
 Intermodal passenger transport
 Aerocar
 Aerocar Aero-Plane
 Aerocar Coot

References

External links
Official Website of Krossblade Aerospace Systems

Roadable aircraft
Emerging technologies
2014 establishments in Arizona
American companies established in 2014
Technology companies established in 2014